Hacılar is a town and district of Kayseri Province, Turkey.

Hacılar or Hajjilar or Gadzhilyar or Gadzhylar or Gadzhilar may refer to several places:

Places

Armenia
 Hajjilar, the former name of Mrgastan, Armenia

Azerbaijan
 Hacılar, Agdash, Azerbaijan
 Hacılar, Aghjabadi, Azerbaijan
 Hacılar, Barda, Azerbaijan
 Hacılar, Gadabay, Azerbaijan
 Hacılar, Khachmaz, Azerbaijan
 Hacılar, Lachin, Azerbaijan
 Hacılar, Tovuz, Azerbaijan

Turkey
 Hacilar, a town and district in Kayseri Province
 Hacılar, Burdur
 Hacılar, Çan
 Hacılar, Çerkeş
 Hacılar, Çubuk, a village in the district of Çubuk, Ankara Province
 Hacılar, Dursunbey, a village
 Hacılar, Gerede, a village in the district of Gerede, Bolu Province
 Hacılar, Gölbaşı, a village in the district of Gölbaşı, Adıyaman Province
 Hacılar, Güdül, a village in the district of Güdül, Ankara Province
 Hacılar, Gülşehir, a village in the district of Gülşehir, Nevşehir Province
 Hacılar, Kızılırmak
 Hacılar, Pazaryolu
 Hacılar, Sivrice
 Hacılar, Yenice
 Hacılar, Yığılca

See also
 Hacılı (disambiguation)